The Kodak EasyShare DX 6490 is a digital camera made by Kodak.  No longer manufactured, the camera was part of the DX Series of Kodak's EasyShare brand.

External links 
User manual at Kodak.com

DX6490